Edward J. Murphy  (January 22, 1877 – January 29, 1935) was an American Major League Baseball pitcher who played from 1898 to 1903. Murphy was born in Auburn, New York, on January 22, 1877. He did not attend college but played his first major league game when he was 21 years old on April 23, 1898. He was a pitcher who threw left-handed and his batting hand was unknown. He died on January 29, 1935, in Weedsport, New York.

References

External links

1877 births
1935 deaths
19th-century baseball players
Major League Baseball pitchers
Baseball players from New York (state)
Philadelphia Phillies players
St. Louis Cardinals players
Binghamton Crickets (1880s) players
Auburn Maroons players
Hartford Cooperatives players
Reading Coal Heavers players
Montreal Royals players
Rochester Bronchos players
Kansas City Blues (baseball) players
Buffalo Bisons (minor league) players
Steubenville Stubs players
Canton Watchmakers players
Syracuse Orangemen baseball coaches
Sportspeople from Auburn, New York
People from Weedsport, New York